"F9mily (You & Me)" is a song by American rapper and singer Lil Nas X and drummer Travis Barker, from Lil Nas X's second EP 7 (2019). It was written by Montero Hill and Barker who produced the song and played the drums.

Production 
Barker had originally intended for a part of the song to be in a song for his rock band Blink-182's upcoming studio album Nine. Barker has said about how he and Lil Nas X got to work on the song:

I have a song with Lil Nas X that's going to be on his EP. He came to the studio, and I played a couple [of] beats that I thought would be stuff he was into. Then I played something on accident where he stopped and was like, "What is that? I've got to have that." It was actually an idea I had for the Blink album.

On May 14, 2019, Lil Nas X posted a snippet of the song on Instagram, and wrote in a comment that it would be titled "9."

In early June, Barker told Spin that he was in studio working with Lil Nas X on a song for Lil Nas X's EP.

Critical reception 
Mikael Wood wrote for Los Angeles Times that the song "has fuzzy Warped Tour guitars and a groove that goes half-time at one point as though designed for a mosh pit". Alternative Press Alex Darus wrote that "rock roots" can be heard in the song, and that Lil Nas X's vocals provide "an edgier vibe".

Brian Josephs of Entertainment Weekly wrote that the song "immediately strikes out as the low point — and not only because pop punk already had its moment in the sun. Lil Nas X's lackadaisical tone doesn't exude cool; he genuinely doesn't sound convinced that the genre needs a revisit."

Charts

References 

2019 songs
Lil Nas X songs
Travis Barker songs
Songs written by Lil Nas X
Songs written by Travis Barker